Tauda is a town in western Eritrea.

Location
The settlement is located in the Gogne subregion of the Gash-Barka region.

Nearby towns and villages include Alegada, Gogne, Ili, Gonye, Dedda, Mescul and Markaughe.

Populated places in Eritrea